Zophodia epischnioides is a species of snout moth in the genus Zophodia. It was described by George Duryea Hulst in 1900. It is found in North America. It is probably a synonym of another Zophodia species or a species of a related genus, but the type is lost and it is thus not possible to determine the status of this species.

References

Moths described in 1900
Phycitini